Eslamabad (also Romanized as Eslāmābād; also known as Dowlatābād, Dowlatābād-e Yaḩyáābād, Dowlatābād-e Yaḩyaābād, and Dowlat Abad Hoomeh) is a village in Ahmadabad Rural District, in the Central District of Firuzabad County, Fars Province, Iran. At the 2006 census, its population was 522, in 126 families.

References 

Populated places in Firuzabad County